MV Shelley Taylor-Smith is a ferry owned by the Public Transport Authority and operated under contract by Captain Cook Cruises on Transperth services on the Swan River in Perth, Western Australia.

History
In February 1997, SBF Shipbuilders of South Coogee was awarded a contract to build a new ferry for Transperth to replace .
It entered service on 18 August 1997, and was named after long-distance swimmer Shelley Taylor-Smith.

References

External links

Ferries of Western Australia
Ships built in Western Australia
1997 ships